Yugoslavia was present at the Eurovision Song Contest 1989, held in Lausanne, Switzerland, and won the competition for the first time.

Before Eurovision

Jugovizija 1989 
The Yugoslav national final to select their entry, Jugovizija 1989, was held on 4 March 1989 at the Grand Hall of the Serbian National Theatre in Novi Sad, and was hosted by Dina Čolić and Boško Negovanović.

The winning song was chosen, from a selection of 16 songs, by the votes of 8 regional juries. Each TV studio had to choose 1 song to be entered directly into the competition, and most submitted a few more songs from which the remaining 8 songs were chosen.

Jury members
 TVSa, Sarajevo: Zlatko Daniš, Miroljub Mitrović, Ismet Arnautalić
 TVLj, Ljubljana: Mario Rijavec , Brane Küzmič, Simona Weiss
 TVBg, Belgrade: Vojkan Borisavljević, Branka Šaper, Maja Sabljić
 TVZg, Zagreb: Anja Šovagović-Despot, Đorđe Novković, Drago Diklić
 TVSk, Skopje: Ljubomir Brangjolica, Sinolička Trpkova, Dimitar Čemkov
 TVPr, Prishtina: Gjon Gjevelekaj, Liliana Çavolli, Ivana Vitaljić
 TVNS, Novi Sad: Đorđe Balašević, Mladen Vranešević, Žarko Petrović
 TVTg, Titograd: Mirsad Serhatlić, Bojan Bajramović, Rade Vojvodić

At Eurovision
Riva was the twenty-second and last performer on the night of the Contest, following Germany. Their song "Rock Me" won the contest with a score of 137 points. However, according to author and historian John Kennedy O'Connor in The Eurovision Song Contest – The Official History it was a very unexpected win and BBC TV commentator Terry Wogan described it as "the death knell" for the contest.

Voting

Notes

References

External links
Yugoslavian National Final 1989

1989
Countries in the Eurovision Song Contest 1989
Eurovision